Grefrath is a municipality in the district of Viersen, in the western part of North Rhine-Westphalia, Germany.

It is situated in the Lower Rhineland region (German: Niederhein), which is located between the river Rhine and the borderline between Germany and the Netherlands.

Geography
The river Niers crosses through the municipality from the south to the north.

The villages of Grefrath and Vinkrath are located on the westerly bank of the small river, whereas Oedt and Mülhausen are situated on the easterly bank.

Towns and municipalities adjoining Grefrath are (clockwise, beginning in the north):
 Wachtendonk
 Kempen
 Tönisvorst
 Viersen
 Nettetal

The nearest bigger cities are Mönchengladbach ( to the south-south-east), Krefeld ( to the east) and Venlo ( to the west).

History 
The town of Grefrath was first mentioned in 1177, at that time bearing the name of Greverode. This stands for "The Earls' Clearing" (German: Rodung der Grafen).
.

In 1243 Grefrath was acquired by the county of Geldern (since 1339: duchy of Geldern) to which it belonged for the next centuries. In 1543 the duchy of Geldern was given to the Burgundian Netherlands, also called the Spanish Netherlands after the division of the House of Habsburg.

During the Eighty Years' War, in which the Seventeen Provinces (predecessor of today's Netherlands) fought for their independence from Spain, Grefrath continued to belong to Spain along with the southerly part of the duchy of Geldern.
Following the conclusion of the Treaty of Utrecht in 1713, the Spanish part of the duchy of Geldern was added to Prussia.

In the course of the French Revolutionary Wars, Grefrath was occupied by the French in 1794. It became an official part of the French territory in 1801, belonging to the department Roer.
After the defeat of Napoleonic France, the left Lower Rhineland region was returned to Prussia as a result of the Congress of Vienna in 1815, and Grefrath was assigned to what later became the Kempen District (Kreis Kempen).

Over a century later, when the country of Prussia was finally dissolved, Grefrath became a part of the newly created German federal state of North Rhine-Westphalia.
In 1970, the municipalities of Grefrath (including the villages of Grefrath and Vinkrath) and Oedt (including the villages of Oedt and Mülhausen) were united.

The United States Army's 507th U.S. Army Artillery Detachment was activated in 1970 and was assigned to the 5th U.S. Army Artillery Group. This detachment consisted of four teams, Alpha Team was headquartered in Grefrath, Germany. These teams were responsible for the security and maintenance of the Nike Hercules missile and was the only nuclear-armed surface-to-air weapon  operational with the US Army.

Natives 
 Clemens Weiss, artist
Paul Veltrup, fencer

References

External links

5th Artillery Group
 U.S.ARMY, EUROPE GERMANY (USAREUR)
USAREUR_5th USAAG 1963 - 1988
Nike People
Former soldier's website who had been stationed in Grefrath

Viersen (district)